{{Speciesbox
|image = Aquilaria malaccensis - Agar Wood, Eaglewood - Indian Aloewood at Munnar (2).jpg
|image_caption = Aquilaria malaccensis at Munnar
|status = CR
|status_system = IUCN3.1
|status_ref = 
|genus = Aquilaria
|species = malaccensis
|authority = Lam.
|synonyms = A. agallochaA. secundaria,
A. malaccense'  Agalochum malaccense}}Aquilaria malaccensis is a species of plant in the Thymelaeaceae family. It is found in Bangladesh, Bhutan, India, Indonesia, Laos, Malaysia, Myanmar, the Philippines, Singapore, and Thailand. It is threatened by habitat loss.
 The World List of Threatened Trees (Oldfield et al., 1998) listed Iran as one of the countries with a population of A. malaccensis, but an exploratory 2002 CITES review confirmed that Iran has no record of the species. As a result Iran is no longer considered as habitat for or producer of agarwood.

EconomicsAquilaria malaccensis is the major source of agarwood, a resinous heartwood, used for perfume and incense.  The resin is produced by the tree in response to infection by a parasitic ascomycetous mould, Phaeoacremonium parasitica, a dematiaceous (dark-walled) fungus.

 Threats 
Due to rising demand for agarwood, as well as shortcomings in monitoring harvests and an increasing illegal trade, A. malaccensis is on the brink of extinction in the wild and is now considered critically endangered on the IUCN Red List. Due to large-scale logging operations, many forested areas where A. malaccensis was once abundant have been destroyed.

 Conservation 
Despite its endangerment, Aquilaria malaccensis'' is highly adaptable and can perform well in areas contaminated by pollution. Due to this, conservation plans have been set in place to raise agarwood in contaminated areas as well as homestead gardens.

References

malaccensis
Taxonomy articles created by Polbot
Critically endangered flora of Asia
Plants described in 1783
Symbols of Tripura